Mar Gregorios College (MGC) is a private college located in Mogappair West, near Chennai. MGC was founded by the Malankara Syrian Catholic Management (MSC Management, Since 1930). The Trust was founded on 1 August 1930 at Trivandrum, Kerala. The college, established in the city of Chennai by the MSCM, a Catholic church in India, is said to be among the top colleges. It is affiliated with Madras University.

MGC was founded in 1994, while Rt. Rev. Dr. Joshua Mar Ignathios, Bishop, Diocese of Mavelikarawas the first director of the college. The college is affiliated with the University of Madras and approved by the government of Tamil Nadu since 1997. The College is ISO 9001:2015 certified Institution.

Courses

The college offers 14 degree programs and 3 postgraduate programs, functioning in two shifts, Shift-I & Shift-II. Shift-I offers under graduation courses in Computer Application, Computer Science, Electronics and Communication Science, Mathematics, Visual Communication, Business Administration, Commerce (Accounting & Finance), Commerce (Corporate Secretaryship), Commerce (General), English and Tamil Literature, Tourism, and Post Graduate Courses in Computer Science, Social Work and Commerce (General). Shift-II offers Under Graduation Courses in Computer Application, Computer Science, Business Administration, Commerce (Computer Application), Commerce (Corporate Secretaryship), Commerce (General).

History

MGC's founding objective was to plan and implement a programme of education in Arts and Sciences, to promote research, disseminate knowledge and to foster the cooperation and exchange of ideas between the academic community and business organizations and to develop entrepreneurship skills among students.

The college is a Christian Minority institution under Syro-Malankara Catholic Church, which runs Medical, Dental, Engineering Colleges and Schools all over India since 1930. Ever since its inception in 1997, Mar Gregorios College has gone from strength to strength and is now one of the premier colleges of the University of Madras. It is named after the late Archbishop of Trivandrum, Benedict Mar Gregorios. It has an  campus.

MGC is a model Christian minority educational institution established in the city of Chennai with an eight-acre campus named after Most Rev. Benedict Mar Gregorios, Late Arch Bishop of Thiruvanandapuram Arch Diocese managed by the Malankara Syrian Catholic Management (MSCM). This management has rendered a remarkable service in the field of Medicine, Engineering, School and Collegiate Education all over India since 1930.

The college aims at offering job-oriented university education with strong basic practical training in a Catholic atmosphere, especially those belonging to less privileged sections of the society. The college fosters personal and professional success through the development of critical thinking, effective communication, creativity, cultural awareness in a safe, accessible and affordable learning environment and embraces equality and accountability through an effective value-based education in a holistic approach.

References

Arts and Science colleges in Chennai
Colleges affiliated to University of Madras